Haroon Imran Gill is a Pakistani politician who was elected member for the Provincial Assembly of Punjab in 2018.

Political career
He was elected to Provincial Assembly of Punjab on a reserved seat for minorities in 2018 Pakistani general election representing Pakistan Tehreek-e-Insaf.  He de-seated due to vote against party policy for Chief Minister of Punjab election  on 16 April 2022.

References

Living people
Pakistan Tehreek-e-Insaf MPAs (Punjab)
Politicians from Punjab, Pakistan
Punjab MPAs 2018–2023
Punjabi people
Year of birth missing (living people)